Chrysoscota brunnea is a moth of the family Erebidae first described by Charles Swinhoe in 1905. It is found on Borneo and Sumatra. The habitat consists of lowland dipterocarp forests, heath forests and lower montane forests.

References

Lithosiina
Moths described in 1905